Regina Margherita ("Queen Margherita") may refer to:
 Margherita of Savoy (1851–1926)
 
 Italian battleship Regina Margherita (1901)
 Regina Margherita (Naples Metro), a metro station under construction

See also
 Ponte Regina Margherita
 Margherita (disambiguation)